Mary Reid (25 April 1953 – 29 January 2003) was an Irish activist, socialist and poet.

Biography
Reid was born in Monaghan to Plunkett and Patricia Reid. Her parents ran a grocery shop in Pettigo, County Donegal. The shop was bombed in 1973 through a loyalist car bomb. The family were not killed. Reid was educated in St Louis convent secondary school in Monaghan before going on to study history and politics at University College Dublin. After graduating with an Arts degree, Reid went on to study law in Trinity College Dublin and later gained two masters degrees in rural development from University College Galway and creative writing from the University of Lancaster.

Reid spoke five languages, fluently in French and Irish and conversational German and Spanish. During her time in UCD Reid got involved with the Official republican movement. Reid became a member of the Irish Republican Socialist Party and became their education officer in 1977. She edited The Starry Plough in 1978–9. Reid worked as a campaigner for the status of paramilitary prisoners and the elimination of the special criminal court. She resigned from the journal in 1979 and moved to Paris where she became a campaigner for political refugees. Reid travelled there on a false passport. She was arrested in 1982 with two other activists. Their apartment supposedly contained guns and explosives while they were connected through the Irish National Liberation Army to Palestinian terrorists wanted for bombing a Jewish shop in Paris. While the group did have connections to Palestinian groups, they did not have a connection to the splinter group that was responsible for the bombing. The group were sentenced to five years but were released after nine months when they were cleared after one of the gendarmes admitted to lying about the arrest and evidence. The three brought and won a lawsuit against the French state in 1989. In 1987 Reid returned to Ireland. Initially she moved to Louisburgh, County Mayo before becoming a lecturer in Women’s Studies in the North West Institute of Further and Higher Education in Derry. She also taught English at a community resource center there.

As a poet Reid wrote in both Irish and English. She had an interest in feminist spirituality and underwent a number of pilgrimages. A collection of her poems was being prepared for publication when she died.

Personal life
She married Cathal Óg Goulding. He father Cathal Goulding was the Official IRA chief of staff. In 1973 they had a son Cathal. During her period of arrest in France Reid’s son was placed in a French foster home until taken in by friends and by his grandmother. Her marriage did not last, her partner was the academic and former IRSP activist Terry Robson from about 1989 to her death. Reid died in 2003 when she drowned while walking her dogs at Lacacurry beach on the Isle of Doagh, Co. Donegal. There was some controversy as it was unclear if she died rescuing her dog or if there were suspicious circumstances around it. However an investigation in 2005 established her death as accidental.

Sources

1953 births
2003 deaths
People from Monaghan (town)
20th-century Irish-language poets
20th-century Irish women writers
Irish women poets
Irish women activists
Irish socialists
Alumni of University College Dublin